Asa is an unincorporated community in Johnson County, Kentucky, United States. It is located at an elevation of 772 feet (220 m). Asa is located in the 41222 ZIP Code Tabulation Area. Weekly happenings in Asa are chronicled in Elaine Brown's Asa Creek News column in The Paintsville Herald.

References

Unincorporated communities in Johnson County, Kentucky
Unincorporated communities in Kentucky